Rachel Ann Jensen Faucett (born November 19, 1972) is a former professional tennis player from the United States.

Biography
Jensen was one of four sibling to play professional tennis, along with twin sister Rebecca and elder brothers Luke and Murphy, who won the French Open together.

Turning professional in 1991, Jensen was the only one of her siblings not to be a doubles specialist. She had a best ranking in singles of 237 in the world and took a set off the top seeded Mary Joe Fernandez at Indian Wells in 1993. As a doubles player she featured in the main draw of the 1991 US Open mixed doubles with brother Luke and the 1995 Australian Open women's doubles partnering Anke Huber.

She is now Rachel Faucett after marriage.

References

External links
 
 

1972 births
Living people
American female tennis players
Twin sportspeople
American twins
People from Ludington, Michigan
Tennis people from Michigan
21st-century American women